Camillo Laurenti (20 November 1861 – 6 September 1938) was an Italian Cardinal of the Roman Catholic Church. He served as Prefect of the Sacred Congregation of Rites from 1929 until his death, and was elevated to the cardinalate in 1921.

Biography

Early life
Camillo Laurenti was born in Monte Porzio Catone, and studied at the Pontifical Gregorian University in Rome, from where he obtained his doctorates in philosophy and in theology. He attended the Capranica College as well. Laurenti was ordained to the priesthood on 7 June 1884, and became an official of the Sacred Congregation for the Propagation of the Faith on the following 1 September.

Whilst serving as professor of philosophy at the Pontifical Urbanian Athenaeum De Propaganda Fide (1892–1908), he was raised to the rank of Privy Chamberlain Supernumerary on 3 August 1889. Laurenti returned to the Roman Curia on 20 October 1908 as Undersecretary of the Congregation for the Propagation of the Faith. He was later named Domestic Prelate of His Holiness on 12 June 1909, and Secretary of the Propagation of the Faith on 12 August 1911. As Secretary, he served as the second-highest official of that dicastery, successively under Cardinals Girolamo Maria Gotti, Domenico Serafini, and Willem van Rossum.

Cardinalate
Pope Benedict XV created him Cardinal-Deacon of S. Maria della Scala in the consistory of 13 June 1921. Laurenti participated in the 1922 papal conclave. He was selected Pope, but according to The Compact History Of The Popes, "he refused to accept the honor". Voting continued and Pope Pius XI was selected.  Pope Pius XI then appointed Laurenti Prefect of Sacred Congregation of Religious on 5 July of that same year.

The Cardinal, after six years as the Vatican overseer of all Roman Catholic religious institutes, was made Pro-Prefect of the Sacred Congregation of Rites on 17 December 1928, rising to become full Prefect on 12 March 1929. He opted for the order of Cardinal Priests on 16 December 1935 and retained his titular church.

Death and burial
Laurenti died in Rome, at age 76, and is buried at the Campo Verano.

External links

References

1861 births
1938 deaths
20th-century Italian cardinals
Almo Collegio Capranica alumni
Protodeacons
Pontifical Urban University alumni
Pontifical Gregorian University alumni
Members of the Sacred Congregation for Rites
Members of the Congregation for Institutes of Consecrated Life and Societies of Apostolic Life
People from the Metropolitan City of Rome Capital